The Hobart Mosque is a mosque in Hobart, Tasmania, Australia.

History
The mosque was established in 1985 as the first and only mosque in Tasmania.

Architecture
The mosque has a capacity of 300 worshipers.

See also
 Islam in Australia
 List of mosques in Oceania

References

External links
 

1985 establishments in Australia
Buildings and structures in Hobart
Mosques completed in 1985
Mosques in Australia
Religious buildings and structures in Tasmania